Mardy Fish was the defending champion, but had to retire in his second round match against Gilles Müller.

Andy Roddick won the title, defeating Müller in the final, 1–6, 7–6(7–2), 6–2.

Seeds
The top four seeds receive a bye into the second round.

Draw

Finals

Top half

Bottom half

Qualifying

Seeds

Qualifiers

Draw

First qualifier

Second qualifier

Third qualifier

Fourth qualifier

References
Main Draw
Qualifying Draw

2012 ATP World Tour
2012 Singles